"Bizzy Body" is the first single by Houston rapper Paul Wall from his studio album Fast Life. It was released on December 8, 2008 through Asylum. The song had a lot of airplay in the clubs, parties, and on the radio.

Track listings and formats
Digital download single
 "Bizzy Body"

External links
 Grills by Paul Wall

2008 singles
2008 songs
Paul Wall songs
Asylum Records singles
Songs written by Webbie
Songs written by Paul Wall